The Nanjagud Taluk inscription is a record registering the grant of a village called Kavahalli or Kalihalli (same as the present village Kahalli) for services in the Kirtinarayana temple at Talakad on the Kaveri river in T.-Narsipur Taluk, Mysore District. It is located in the village Kahahalli in Hobali of Bilgere, on a stone lying near the village entrance. It belongs to the reign of the Vijayanagar king Krishnaraya and is dated S' 1434 Srimukha sam. Phal. ba. 5. This date corresponds to March 15, A. D. 1514, if we take S' 1434 expired or S' 1435 current Srimukha as the year intended. There are some peculiar features in the historical portion of this record. The king Krishnaraya is here styled Krishnavarma-mahadhiraja (L.8) as is aged the case in two other inscriptions of the same Taluk (E. C. III. Nanjangud 190 and 195 of 1512 and 1513 A. D.). He is given some titles of the Western Gangas and Hoysalas. (Jitam bhagavata gata-Ghana-gaganabhena L.3, : Yadava-kulambara-dyumani samyaktva-chudamani). Another point to notice in this record is the mention of the king's visit to the southern part of his empire on a conquering expedition. Saluva Timmarasa and his brother Saluva Govindaraja were ministers of Krishnaraja and Govindaraja was entrusted with the government of Terakanambi kingdom (see E. C. IV Gundlupet 3 of S 1435 and 1 of S 1444, etc.,) and his grants are frequently met with in the Nanjangud, Chamarajanagar and Gundlupet Taluks. (E. C. Ill Nanjangud 196 of S’ 1435; T.-Narsipur 42 of S’ 1445 ; T.-Narsipur 73 of S’ 1441 : E. C. IV Gundlup6t 1, 3, 35 ; Chamarajanagar 99 of S 1445, 111 etc.) In some of these records their gotra is given as Kaundinya and not as Khandava. The temple of Kirtinarayana at Talakad is a Hoysala structure and is believed to have been constructed by king Vishnuvardhana (see M. A. R. 1912, p. 11). Not only are the revenues of the village stated to have been granted for services in the temple but also the utsava-images of the god and goddesses with ornaments either newly prepared or belonging to some other temple are said to have been sent from Vijayanagar, the capital. Lastly the grant is stated to have been made at the insistence of a Brahman named Upavasi- Achariya. The usual imprecatory stanzas are found at the end of the grant.

Text

Kannada Language and Characters                                                 
ನಂಜನಗೂಡು ತಾಲ್ಲೂಕು ಬಿಲ್ಗೆರೆ ಹೋಬಾ೪ ಕಾಹಲ್ಲಿ ಗ್ರಾಮದ ಅಂಕದ ಬಾಗಿಲಬಲ ಬಿದ್ದಿ ರುವ ಕಲ್ಲು

ಪ್ರಮಾಣ 5’× 3’- 6”.
                                
1.            ಸ್ವಸ್ತಿಶ್ರೀ  ವಿಜಯಾಭ್ಯದಯ ಶಾಲವಾಹನಶಕ ವರುಷ

2.	೧೪೩೪ ಸಂದುನಡವಂತ ....ಶ್ರೀಮುಖಸಂವತ್ಸರದ ಫಾಲ್ಗು ಬ ೫ ಸ್ವಸ್ತಿಜಿತಂ

3.	ಭಗವತಾ ಗತ ಘನಗಗನಾಭಿನ್ರೀ |ಸ್ಧಿ ರಸಿ0ಹಾಸನಾರೂಢ ಶ್ರೀಮಹಾರಾಜರಾ

4.	ಜಪರವೇಶ್ವಗ ಶ್ರೀಮನ್ಮ ಹಾಮೇದಿನೀ  ಮೀಸಯರ ಗಂಡಕಠಾರಿ ಸಾಲುವ ಶ್ರೀ ಮದಕ್ಷಣಸಮು

5.	ದ್ರಾಧಿಪತಿನಾರಸಿ0ಹ ವರ್ಮಮಹಾದಿರಾಜ ತತ್ಪುತ್ರ ಪಿತುನ್ವಾಗತ ಯಾದವ ಕುಲಾ0ಬ

6.	ರದ್ಯುಮಣಿ ಸಮ್ಯಕ್ತ್ವಚೂಡಾಮಣಿ ಸಕಲವಂಬ ಬೃ0ದಸಂದೋಹ [ಸಂತರ್ಪಣ] ಪರನಾರೀಸಹೋದರ

7.	ಸೌಚವೀರ ಪರಾಕ್ರಮಾಧಾರ ಸ [ಕ] ಲ ದೇಸಾಧಿಸ್ವರ ಮಣಿಮಕುಟ ಚರಣಾರವಿ0ದ ಕಠಾರಿ

8.	ತ್ರಣೀತ್ರ ಶ್ರೀಮತ್ಕ್ರುಷ್ಣವರ್ಮಮಹಾಧಿರಾಜ ಪ್ರುಧಿವಿರಾಜ್ಯಂಗಯೊತ್ತಿರಲು ದಕ್ಷಿಣದೇ

9.	ಶದಲ್ಲ ವಿಜಯವಾಗಿ ಚಿತ್ತಯಸಿದ ವೀರಕೃಷ್ಣರಾಯರ ನಿರೂಪದಿ0 ಶ್ರೀಮನು ಮಹಪ್ರದಾನಂ ಯ

10.	ಜುಸಾಖೆಯ ಖಾ0ಡವ ಗೋತ್ರದ ಆಪಸ್ತಂಭ ಸೂತ್ರದ ಶ್ರೀಮನು ಸಾಲ್ರವ ತಿ0ಮರಸರು ದಕ್ಷಣ

11.	ವಾರಣಾಸಿ ಗಜಾರಣ್ಯಕ್ಷೀತ್ರ ರಾಜರಾಜ ಪುರವಾದ ತ೪ಕಾಡಲ ಶ್ರೀಮಹಾದೇವದೇವೋ

12.	ತ್ರಮಕೀರ್ತಿನಾರಾಯಣ ದೇವರಿಗೆ ಥಾಯೂರಸ್ಥ ೪ದ ಕಾವಹಲಿಯೊ೪ಗಣ ಗದೆಬೆದಲು ತೋ

13.	ಟತುಡಕೆ ಸುವರ್ಣಾದಾಯ ನಿಧನಿಕ್ಷೇಪ ಜಲಪಾಷಾಣ ಆಗಾಮಿ ಸಿಧಸಾಧ್ಯವಂಬಆ

14.	ಷ್ಟಭೋಗ ತೆಜಸ್ವಮ್ಯ [ಎ] ಲ್ಲವಂನು ಆಗುಮಾಡಿ ಆನುಭವಿಸಿಕೊ0ಡು ಸಲುವ ಅದಾಯವರಹ

15.	ಗ ೧೩೦`೨ ಆಕ್ಷರದಲು ನೂಅ ಮುವತ್ತು ವರಹವೆರಡಂ ಕೀರ್ತಿ ನಾರಾಯಣದೇವರ

16.	ಮಧ್ಯಾ0ನ ವಮೂರು ಅವಸರಕೆ  ಗ ೧೩೦ ನ ಗ್ರಾಮವನು ವಿಜಯನಗರಿಯ ಪ0ಪಾಕ್ಷೇತ್ರದಲು

17.	ತು0ಗಭದ್ರಾತೀರದಲ ವಿರೂಪಾಕ್ಷಲಂಗ ... ದೇವರ ಸಂನಿಧಿಯಲ ತಥಾಸ

18.	ಮಯ [ದ] ಲಿ ಶ್ರೀಕೀರ್ತಿನಾರಾಯಣ ದೇವರಿಗೆ ಕಾಲಿಹಲ್ಲಿ ಗ್ರಾಮವನು ಕಷ್ಣಾರ್ಪಣವೆ0

19.	ದು ಸಹಿರಂಣ್ಯೋದಕ ದಾನಧಾರಾಪೂರ್ವಕವಾಗಿ ವಿಜಯ ಉತ್ಸವದೇ

20.	ವರದೇವಿಯರು ಆಭರಣಸಹಿತವಾಗಿ ಶ್ರೇಕೀರ್ತಿನಾರಾಯಣದೇವರ ಭಂಡಾರ

21.	ಕ್ಕೆ ಆಚಂದ್ರಾರ್ಕ್ಕಸ್ತಾಯ ಆಗಿನಡೆಉದುಕೂಟಕಾಲಹಲ್ಲಿಯ ಗ್ರಾಮದ

22.	ಸ್ತ ೪ ಕ್ರಿಷ್ಣರಾಯರು ಸಾಲುವತಿ0ಮಯರಿಗುಧರ್ಮವಾಗಬೀಕೆ0ದು ಭಾರ

23.	ದ್ವಾಜಗೋತ್ರದ ಯಜುಸಾಖೆಯ ಆಪಸ್ತಂಬಸೂತ್ರದ ಉಪವಾಸಿ ಆಚರಿಯ

24.	ನು ಬಿ0ನಹ ಮಾಕೊಡಿಸಿದಗ್ರಾಮ | ದಾನಪಾಲನಯೋರ್ಮಧ್ಯೇ ದಾನಾಭ್ರೇ

25.	ಯೋನುಪಾಲನಂ ದನಾಸ್ವರ್ಗರ್ಮವಾಪ್ನೇತಿ ಪಾಲನಾದ ಚುತಂ ಪದಂ ಸ್ವದತ್ತಾ0

26.	ದ್ವಗುಣಂ ಪುಣ್ಯಂ ಪರದತ್ತಾನುಪಾಲನಂ | ಪರದತ್ತಾಪಹರೇಣಸ್ವದತ್ತಂ

27.	ನಿಷ್ಪಲಂಭವೇತ್ತು | ಸಾಮಾ0ನೋಯಂಧರ್ಮಸೇ ತುರುನು,ಪಾಣಾ0 ಕಾಲೇಕಾಲೇ

28.	ಪಾಲನೀಯೋಭವದ್ಭಿ‌‌‌ಹ ಸರ್ವಾನೇತಾನೆ ಭಾವಿನಹ ಪಾರ್ದಿವೇ0ದ್ರಾನೆಭೂಯೋಭೂ

29.	ಯೋ ಯಾಚತೇ ರಾಮಚಂದ್ರಹ | ಸ್ವದತ್ತಾ0 ಪರದತ್ತಾ0ವಾ ಯೋಹರೇತಿವ

30.	ಸು0ಧರಾ0 ಷಷ್ಷಿ ವಗಷ ಸಹಸ್ರಣಿ ವಿಷ್ಷಾಯತೇ ಕ್ರಿಮಿಹ |

31.	ಯಿಧರ್ಮವನು ಆರೊ ಆಲುವಿದವರು

32.	ಗಂಗತಡಿಯಲ ಕವಿಲೆಯಕೊ0ದಪಾಪ

33.	ಕೆಹೋಹರು.Transliteration

1. Svasti sri vijayabhyudaya Salivahana saka  varusha

2.1434 sandu nadavanta..... srimukha samvatsarada Phalgu ba 5 svasti jitam

3.bhagavata gata Ghana gaganabhena sthira simhasanarudha sri mahajadhiraja ra-

4.ja-paramesvara sriman maha-medini, miseyara-ganda kathari-saluva sriman dekshina-samu-

5.dradhipati Narasimha varma-maharajadhiraja tat putra pitur-anv-agata Yadava'''-kulamba-

6.ra-dyumani samyaktva- chudamini sakala-vandi-brind-sandoha [santarpana]paranarisahodara

7.sauchavira(sarvavira?) parakramadhara sa [ka] la desadhisvara-mani-makuta charanaravinda kathari-

8.trinetra srimat krishnavarma maharajadhiraja prudhvirajyam geyinottiralu Dakshina de-

9.sadalli vijayavagi chittayisida vira Krishnarayara nirupadim srimanu mahapradhanam Ya-

10.ju sakheya khandava gotrada Apastambha sutrada srimanu Saluva Timmarasaru Dakshina -

11.varanasi Gajaranyakshetra Rajarajapurvada Talakadali sri mahadevadevo-

12. ttama kirti Narayana devarige thayura-sthalada kavahaliyolagana gade bedalu to-

13. ta tudake suvarnadaya nidhi-nikshepa-jala-pashana akshini-agami-sidha-
sadhyavemba a-

14. shta-bhoga taja-svamya [e] llavamnu agumadi anubhavisikondu saluva adaya varaha

15.ga 130‘2 aksharadalu nuramuvattu varahaveradam Kirtinarayapa davara

16. Madhyamna muru avasarake ga 130 na gramavanu Vijayanagariya
Pampakshetradalu

17. Tungabhadra-tiradali Virupaksha-linga.....davara sannidhiyali tatha-sa-

18. maya [da] li Sri Kirti Narayana-davarige Kalihalli-gramavanu Krishna-rpanaven-

19. du sa-hiramnyodaka-dana-dhara-purvakavagi Vijayanagariya utsava-de-

20, Varu deviyaru abharana sahitavagi sri Kirti Narayana-devara bhandara-

21. Kke a-chandrarkka-sthayi-agi nadeudu yendu kota Kalihalliya gramada

22. Stala Krishna-rayaru Saluva Timmayarigu dharmavagabakendu Bhara-

23. Dvaja-gotrada Yajusakheya Apastamba-sutrada U pavasi-achariya-

24. nu biunahamadi kodisida grama | dana-palanayor madhye danachhre-

25. yonupalanam dana svargam avapnoti palanad aohutam padam sva-dattam

26. dvigunam punyam paradattanupalanam | paradattapaharena sva-dattam

27. nisphalam bhavatu | samanyo yam dharma-seturu nrupanam kale
kale

28. palaniyo bhavadbhih | sarvan etan bhavinah parthivendran bhuyo bhu-

29. yo yochate Ramachandrah | sva-dattam para-dattam va yo hareti va-

30. sundharam shashti-varusha-sahasrani vishtayam jayate krimih|
 
31. yi-dharmavanu arobaru alupidavaru

32. Gange-tadiyali kavileya konda papa-

33. ke hoharu

Translation
Be it well. In the victorious and prospering Salivahana era, 1431 years having
expired, while the year Srimukha was current, on the 5th lunar day of the dark
half of Phalguna : — Be it well. Victory to the Adorable (Padmanabha) who resembles the sky free
from clouds.While the illustrious Krishnavarma-mahadhiraja seated on the stable throne, ‘the prosperous king of kings, lord of kings, champion over those who wear moustaches in the great earth, kathdri-sahwa (dagger and kite), ruler over the southern sea,
Narasimha-mahadhiraja's son ; a sun to the firmament that is the Yadava race of
which he is a lineal descendant ; crest-jewel to righteousness, (delighter) of all the
assemblage of bards, brother to the wives of others, support for purity, heroism and prowess; possessed of lotus-like feet on which bow the jewelled crowns of all the kings, kathari-trinitra (a Siva in the use of dagger) : was ruling the earth :— Under the orders of vira Krishnaraya, while he was pleased to go on a victorious
expedition to the south : —the illustrious mahapradhana (chief minister) Saluva
Timmarasa of Yajus-sakha, Khandava-gotra, and Apastambha-sutra made a gift to the best of the gods, Kirtinarayanadevaru of Talakad which is Rajarajapura, south Benares and Gajaranya-kshetra, of the village Kavahalli in Thayuru-sthala, with the right to enjoy the eight rights and powers in the village including all the rice-fields, dry lands, gardens, vegetable gardens (tudike), money income, treasure, deposits underground, water springs, rocks, imperishables, future accruals, existing rights and possibilities. The said village Kalialli with its income amounting to 130 varahas and two hanas is granted for the three services, in the afternoon, of the god Kirtinarayana
and the gift is made in the Pampa-kshetra which is the same as Vijayanagari, on the banks of the Tungabhadra, and in the presence of the God Virhpaksha-linga on the above occasion, as a holy gift (Krishnarpana) with pouring of water and gold; and the village is made over, together with the procession images of the gods and goddesses at Vijayanagari and their ornaments, into the treasury of the god Kirtina-rayana, in order that the gift might last as long as the moon and sun endure. The gift of the village was made at the request of Upavasi Achariya of Bharadvaja gotra, Yajussakhe, and Apastamba-sutra, for the merit of Krishnaraya and Saluva Timma.Between making a gift and maintaining one already made, maintenance is better than gift. By a gift one obtains heaven and by protecting a gift one goes to a region from which there is no fall. Maintaining a gift made by others is twice as meritorious as making a gift oneself. By confiscating another's gift, one's own gift becomes fruitless. “This bridge of dharma is common to all kings and should be protected by you from time to time.” Thus does Ramachandra beseech again and again all future rulers. He who seizes land gifted by himsolf or by others is borm as a worm in ordure for 60,000 years. Whoever destroys this gift will incur the sin of killing tawny cows on the banks of the Ganges.

See also
Indian inscriptions
Indian copper plate inscriptions
Early Indian epigraphy
Epigraphia Carnatica
History of Karnataka 
Timeline of Karnataka
Etymology of Karnataka
Old Kannada#Origin

References

Linguistic history of India
 
Historiography of India
History of Karnataka
 
Literature of Karnataka
Asian archaeology
Archaeology of India
16th-century inscriptions